Fog Line is a 1970 short silent experimental film directed by Larry Gottheim. It shows a rural landscape with slowly dissipating fog.

Description

Fog Line is a single, static 11-minute shot of a rural landscape. At the beginning of the film, heavy fog obscures the view. Two sets of telephone lines run across the frame, roughly trisecting the image (thus the title). Over the course of the film, the fog gradually clears, revealing various figures in the field. Several trees are scattered through the area. Two horses enter the frame and graze across the bottom of the image, and a bird flies across the field.

Production
After completing his PhD at Yale University, Gottheim moved up to Binghamton University in New York. He shot Fog Line near his home there. He chose to film a section of the countryside through which horses passed in the morning. He studied the area for months and filmed it multiple times. Gottheim used a telephoto lens to shoot the film.

Release
Fog Line screened at the New York Film Festival in 2005. A digital transfer was made for its inclusion in the 2008 DVD collection Treasures IV: American Avant-Garde Film, 1947-1986.

Reception
Critic Dave Kehr called Fog Line "one of the most hauntingly beautiful of all avant-garde films". Director Paul Schrader remarked that it "demonstrates how magical waiting can be."

See also
Minimalist film
Slow cinema

References

External links
 Fog Line at the Film-Makers' Cooperative
 
 Official DVD trailer of Larry Gottheim's films including Fog Line

1970s avant-garde and experimental films
1970 short films
American avant-garde and experimental films
American silent films
Films shot in New York (state)
Landscape art
One-shot films
Silent films in color
Silent short films
1970s American films